The Haima F7 or Haima Family F7 (福美来F7) is a Compact MPV that is manufactured by the Chinese manufacturer Haima.

Overview

Originally code named the Haima VB100 during development, it debuted at the 2016 Beijing Auto Show as the Haima V70 with prices starting at 79,800 yuan and ending at 129,800 yuan. The Haima F7 is powered by a 2.0-litre engine developing 152hp and 185nm, and a 1.5-litre turbo engine with 156hp and 220nm. Transmission options include a six-speed manual transmission or six-speed automatic transmission. The name was then changed to Haima Family F7 in 2017 to sit under the Family product series.

References

External links

 Official website
 Haima F7 

Haima vehicles
FAW Group vehicles
Compact MPVs
Minivans
Front-wheel-drive vehicles
Cars of China
Cars introduced in 2016
2010s cars